Abdul-Samed Muhamed Gunu (born 6 April 1966) is a Ghanaian politician and a member of the Seventh Parliament of the Fourth Republic of Ghana representing the Savelugu Constituency in the Northern Region on the ticket of the New Patriotic Party.

Early life and education 
Gunu hails from Savelugu in the northern region of Ghana. He attended Ghana Senior High School in Tamale, popularly known as GHANASCO. He studied accounting at Tamale Polytechnic in 2000 and proceeded to obtain a master's degree in NGO and Rural Development from the University for Development Studies in 2010.

Politics 
Gunu is a politician of the New Patriotic Party and a member of the seventh parliament of the 4th Republic of Ghana representing the Savelugu Constituency of the Northern Region of Ghana. He contested in the 2016 Ghanaian general elections and won his seat with a total of 13,334 representing 34.21% of the total valid votes cast that year.

Personal life 
He is a Muslim and married with eight children.

References

Ghanaian MPs 2017–2021
1966 births
Living people
Ghanaian Muslims
Ghana Senior High School (Tamale) alumni